Proline rich 11 is a protein that in humans is encoded by the PRR11 gene.

References

Further reading